Kavitha Ranjini, known by the stage name Urvashi, is an Indian actress, dubbing artist, television host, scriptwriter and producer known for her works in the Southern film industry, predominantly in Malayalam and Tamil films. She has won one National Film Award, five Kerala State Film Awards, three Tamil Nadu State Film Awards and two Filmfare Award South respectively. Known for her distinct style of acting, she is widely regarded as one of the finest actors of Malayalam cinema

Urvashi was a prominent lead actress of the 1980s and 1990s, primarily in Malayalam Films. She has written the films Ulsavamelam and Pidakkozhi Koovunna Noottandu, the latter was also produced by her. She won the National Film Award for Best Supporting Actress for her performance in Achuvinte Amma (2005), which was her comeback movie after a period of 6 years. She has won the Kerala State Film Award for Best Actress, with a record five times, which includes three consecutive wins from 1989 to 1991. She has also received two Tamil Nadu State Film Awards.

Early and personal life

Urvashi was born to popular drama actors Chavara V. P. Nair and Vijayalakshmi in Sooranad,kollam district. Her elder sisters are actors Kalaranjini and Kalpana. Her two brothers, Kamal Roy and Prince had also acted in few Malayalam movies. Prince (Nandu of Layanam fame) committed suicide at the age of 26. She had her primary education from Fort Girl's Mission High School, Thiruvananthapuram, until fourth grade and later at Corporation Higher Secondary School, Kodambakkam until ninth grade, when the family shifted to Chennai. She couldn't continue her studies since she had become busy with her movie career by then. Firstly, Urvashi was acting in three films, Bhagyaraj saw the rush and booked her in Munthanai Mudichi. Those three directors helped Urvashi to get preference in Munthanai Mudichi call-sheets. They calculated that the film would become a hit, then they could release their films with much profit.

Urvashi married film actor Manoj K. Jayan on 2 May 2000. They have a daughter, Teja Lakshmi born in November 2001. However, they got divorced in 2008. Urvashi then married Chennai based builder Sivaprasad in November 2013. The couple had a boy, Ishaan Prajapathi in August 2014.

Career
She acted in around 702 films in Malayalam, Tamil, Telugu, Kannada and Hindi. She started her acting career as a child artist, at the age of 10, in a Malayalam movie Kathirmandapam, released in 1979, as Jayabharathi's daughter. She acted as Srividya's dance student in the movie Digvijayam, released in 1980, she plays Krishna in the song sequence Madhumaasa Nikunjathil, where her sister Kalpana plays Radha. She has also acted as a child artist in Ninaivukal Maraivathillai, a Tamil movie, in 1983, but it was never released. Then she acted as a heroine, at the age of 13, to Karthik in the movie Thodarum Uravu, which completed shooting in 1983, but released in 1986.

Her first released film as heroine was Munthanai Mudichchu (Tamil, directed by K. Bhagyaraj) in 1983, making her debut movie. Ethirppukal (Malayalam, 1984) was one of her earlier films in Malayalam. During the peak of her career, she starred in M. P. Sukumaran Nair's award-winning film Kazhakam in 1995, without taking a single penny as remuneration. She was awarded Best Actress for this role. She has acted in some advertisements, and has participated in many stage shows also.

She has acted in successful movies with Kamal Haasan which became super hit blockbuster in Tamil cinema.

Filmography

Awards and nominations

References

External links
 
 
 Urvashi at MSI

Living people
20th-century Indian actresses
Women artists from Kerala
21st-century Indian actresses
Actresses in Malayalam cinema
Actresses in Tamil cinema
Actresses in Telugu cinema
Actresses in Kannada cinema
Best Supporting Actress National Film Award winners
Filmfare Awards South winners
Kerala State Film Award winners
Indian film actresses
Actresses from Thiruvananthapuram
Tamil Nadu State Film Awards winners
1970 births
Child actresses in Malayalam cinema
Indian television actresses
Actresses in Malayalam television
Actresses in Kannada television
Actresses in Telugu television
Actresses in Tamil television
Indian women television presenters
Actresses in Hindi cinema
Tamil comedians
Indian voice actresses